Koshta (also spelt as Koshti) are a Hindu caste found in the Indian states of Uttar Pradesh, Bihar, Madhya Pradesh, Chhattisgarh, Maharashtra, Gujarat and Andhra Pradesh.

Origin 
Koshta claim to be descendants of Markandeya Rishi.
Subdivisions - The caste have several subdivisions of different types.  The Halbis appear to be an offshoot of the primitive Halba tribe, who have taken to weaving,  the Lad Koshtis come from Gujarat, the Gadhewal from Garha or Jubbulpore, the Deshkar and Maratha from the Maratha country, while the Dewangan probably take their name from the old town of that name on the Wardha river.  The Patwis are dyers, and colour the silk thread which the weavers use to border their cotton cloth.  It is usually dyed red with lac.  They also make braid and sew silk thread on ornaments like the separate Patwa caste.  And the Onkule are the offspring of illegitimate unions.  In Berar there is a separate subcaste named Hatghar, which may be a branch of the Dhangar or shepherd caste.  Berar also has a group known as Jain Koshtis, who may formerly have professed the Jain religion,  but are now strict Sivites.  The Salewars are said to be divided into the Sutsale or thread-weavers, the Padmasale or those who originally wove the lotus flower and the Sagunsale, a group of illegitimate descent. The above names show that the caste is of mixed origin, containing a large Telugu element, while a body of the primitive Halbas has been incorporated into it.  Many of the Maratha Koshtis are probably Kunbis(Cultivators) who have taken up weaving.  The caste has also a number of exogamous divisions of the usual type which serve to prevent the marriage of near relatives.

Language 
The Koshti language is a distinct Indo-Aryan language with words derived from Sanskrit in either their tatsama or tadbhava form. 
Koshti also contains words borrowed from languages like Marathi, Khari-boli, Bundeli, Chhattisgarhi and variants of Hindi.

Occupation
The majority of Koshta today are employed in cotton and silk mills of both the public and private sectors. They have also begun to work in bidi making, brass cutlery and utensil manufacturing, tile and brick making and construction work.

References 

Indian castes
Weaving communities of South Asia
Social groups of Bihar
Social groups of Gujarat
Social groups of Karnataka
Social groups of Madhya Pradesh
Social groups of Maharashtra
Social groups of Tamil Nadu
Social groups of Uttar Pradesh